White Zinfandel is a type of Rosé wine that falls between the categories of off-dry and sweet. It is made from Zinfandel grapes, which are typically used to produce a full-bodied and spicy red wine, also called Zinfandels. White Zinfandels were purportedly created by Sutter Home Family Vineyards winemaker Bob Trinchero in 1975 through a chance occurrence during the fermentation process. In 2018, Sutter Home held a significant market share in the White Zinfandel industry, accounting for 29.1% of the total dollar sales and 73.1% of the 187 mL (6.3 U.S. fl oz) segment of the market. Other wineries and beverage manufacturers also produce and sell this variety of wine.

See also 
California wine
 White Merlot
 Oeil de perdrix, the style of wine that Sutter Home was making that led to White Zinfandel

References 

Wine styles